Memphis Independent School District is a public school district based in Memphis, Texas (USA).

Located in Hall County, the district also serves the towns of Estelline and Lakeview. Small portions of the district extend into Childress, Collingsworth, and Donley counties.

In 2009, the school district was rated "recognized" by the Texas Education Agency.

History

On July 1, 1989, Memphis ISD annexed Estelline Independent School District, which became dormant in 1987. On July 1, 2000 Lakeview Independent School District consolidated into Memphis ISD. The Lakeview merger occurred after voters in both the Memphis and Lakeview districts agreed to a merge: 232 of 239 participants residing in Memphis ISD voted to merge.

Schools 
Memphis High School (Grades 9–12)
Memphis Middle School (Grades 6–8)
Austin Elementary School (Grades 3–5)
Travis Elementary School (Grades PK-2)

References

External links
Memphis ISD

School districts in Hall County, Texas
School districts in Childress County, Texas
School districts in Collingsworth County, Texas
School districts in Donley County, Texas